Edwin Busuttil (1923-2009) was a Maltese politician, son of Paul and Therese (Spiteri) Busuttil. He served as Head of Department of Public Law and Criminal Law, as well as Dean of the Faculty of Law and Pro-Rector at the University of Malta.

Education
He pursued his bachelor's from University Malta, 1943. Also, he had done his Doctor of Laws from University Malta, 1946. He had done his BLitt from University Oxford, England, 1949. He had done his Master of Arts from University Oxford, 1952.

Career 
In his early life (1960-1961), he was worked as a Research fellow, North Atlantic Treaty Organization Paris, Kentucky, United States.In 1962-1987 he worked as a professor public law in University Malta.

Busuttil was Deputy Leader of Malta's Constitutional Party and was a member of Parliament between 1952 and 1953, as well as Speaker of the House of Representatives. He served as a member of the University Senate, the University Council, the Medical Council, Chairman of the Broadcasting Authority, Chairman of the Disciplinary Board of the Public Service Commission and Electoral Commissioner. Busuttil served on the European Commission of Human Rights for 32 years and the European Commission’s Delegate to Human Rights Conferences all over the world. He carried the post of Government Consultant on the Ratification of International Treaties. Busuttil was Vice-President of the Centro Internazionale di Ricerche, Studi Sociologici, Penali e Penitenziari of Messina, Italy.

He is the author of publications and articles in legal publications. He was a Rhodes Scholar at Christ Church, Oxford from 1942.

Personal life 
Busuttil died on December 20, 2009, and was survived by his wife Emma and three sons, Clarence, Graham, and Trafford.

He is buried at the cemetery of Santa Maria Addolorata ("Our Lady of Sorrows") in Paola, the largest graveyard of the country.

References

 Former Speaker Edwin Busuttil dies

1923 births
2009 deaths
Speakers of the House of Representatives of Malta
People from Floriana
Members of the European Commission of Human Rights
Maltese Rhodes Scholars
Academic staff of the University of Malta
Alumni of Christ Church, Oxford
University of Malta alumni
20th-century Maltese politicians